Roberval is a provincial electoral district in the Saguenay–Lac-Saint-Jean region of Quebec, Canada, that elects members to the National Assembly of Quebec. It notably includes the municipalities of Dolbeau-Mistassini, Saint-Félicien, Roberval, Normandin, Saint-Prime and Albanel.

It was created for the 1931 election from parts of the Lac-Saint-Jean provincial electoral district.

In the change from the 2001 to the 2011 electoral map, it gained Saint-André-du-Lac-Saint-Jean and part of the unorganized territory of Passes-Dangereuses from Lac-Saint-Jean electoral district.

The district is named after 16th century French explorer Jean-François de la Roque de Roberval.

Members of the Legislative Assembly / National Assembly

Election results

* Result compared to Action démocratique

* Result compared to UFP

|-
 
|Liberal
|Karl Blackburn
|align="right"|11,930
|align="right"|39.17
|align="right"|+14.38
|-

|-

|-

|}
* Result compared to PDS

|-
 
|Liberal
|Pierre Thibeault
|align="right"|7,978
|align="right"|24.79
|align="right"|-12.10

|-

|Socialist Democracy
|Pieter Wentholt
|align="right"|294
|align="right"|0.91
|align="right"|–
|-

|}

|-
 
|Liberal
|Jean-Marc Gendron
|align="right"|11,226
|align="right"|36.89
|align="right"|-16.42
|-
 
|Natural Law
|Normand Dufour 
|align="right"|923
|align="right"|3.03
|align="right"|–
|-

|}

|-
 
|Liberal
|Gaston Blackburn
|align="right"|14,931
|align="right"|53.31
|align="right"|-8.70
|-

|-

|-
 
|Liberal
|Gaston Blackburn
|align="right"|16,152
|align="right"|62.02
|align="right"|+15.80
|-

|-

|Parti indépendantiste
|Stéphane Duchesne 
|align="right"|313
|align="right"|1.20
|align="right"|–
|-

|La Belle Province de Québec
|Alexandre Roy 
|align="right"|224
|align="right"|0.86
|align="right"|–
|-

|}

|-
 
|Liberal
|Patrice Laroche
|align="right"|14,649
|align="right"|46.22
|align="right"|+7.97
|-
 
|Christian Socialist
|Gilles Boivin
|align="right"|364
|align="right"|1.15
|align="right"|–
|-

|}

|-
 
|Liberal
|Robert Lamontagne
|align="right"|12,760
|align="right"|38.25
|align="right"|-1.42
|-

|-

|}

|-
 
|Liberal
|Robert Lamontagne
|align="right"|11,767
|align="right"|39.67
|align="right"|-13.39
|-

|-
 
|Ralliement créditiste
|Émilien Fradet
|align="right"|3,923
|align="right"|13.22
|align="right"|-4.89
|-

|-

|}

References

External links
Information
 Elections Quebec

Election results
 Election results (National Assembly)
 Election results (QuébecPolitique)

Maps
 2011 map (PDF)
 2001 map (Flash)
2001–2011 changes (Flash)
1992–2001 changes (Flash)
 Electoral map of Saguenay–Lac-Saint-Jean region 
 Quebec electoral map, 2011 

Roberval
Dolbeau-Mistassini
Roberval, Quebec
Saint-Félicien, Quebec